Albert Frank "Ab" Rogers (born September 16, 1909, date of death not found) was a Canadian ice hockey player.

Rogers was a member of the Saskatoon Quakers who represented Canada at the 1934 World Ice Hockey Championships held in Milan, Italy where they won Gold.

See also
List of Canadian national ice hockey team rosters

References

1909 births
Canadian ice hockey right wingers
Saskatoon Quakers players
Year of death missing